Leppävaara station is a railway station located in Leppävaara, a district of the city of Espoo in Finland.

History
Near the construction site of the Rantarata line was the financial building of the Alberga Manor. In 1905, the municipality of Espoo sought permission to build a railway stop in place of the manor, but this permission was denied. However, suburban settlement rapidly started appearing near the manor, so it was necessary to build a railway stop.

Leppävaara station was built in 1903 and the first station building in 1907. In 1920, a tightly-populated community was founded from the suburban area according to a zoning plan made by Lars Sonck. The suburban settlement also spread to the north of the station, where the Harakka area was founded, now known as the district of Lintuvaara.

Traffic arrangements at the Leppävaara railway station were changed in 1965, when a rapidly trafficked local road was drawn over the tracks via an overpass bridge; the Ring I beltway currently runs at the site. The station area started to become a population centre, where a modern Maxi-Market store was opened in 1972. Cargo traffic at the Leppävaara railway station was discontinued in 1975, but passenger traffic was improved by building an underpass tunnel in the following year.

The greatest change occurred in autumn 1999 when the station building was torn down to build a new railroad track in Leppävaara and a new terminal. The significance of the Leppävaara railway station has increased in the 21st century as many bus lines previously going to Helsinki have been directed to Leppävaara to serve as feeder traffic for local commuter trains.

The Sello shopping centre has brought more traffic to the station since late 2002, the latter part having been completed in autumn 2005. The shopping centre is located right next to Leppävaara station.

Connections
All local trains to Siuntio (Y and X trains), Kirkkonummi (U train) and Kauklahti (E train) stop at Leppävaara, in addition to all Pendolino and InterCity services from Helsinki to Turku and Turku Satama (Turku Harbour). Long-distance trains between Helsinki and Turku have stopped at Leppävaara since 25 October 2015, before this they stopped at Espoo railway station in Espoon keskus.

The construction of the new track in 2002 caused part of the train schedules and stops to be rearranged, and introduced the A train, stopping at all stations.

Service

Tracks
There are four tracks at the Leppävaara railway station.
 Track 1 is for commuter trains E, U, X and Y towards Kirkkonummi and for long-distance trains to Turku.
 Track 2 is for commuter trains E, U, X and Y as well as long-distance trains towards Helsinki.
 Track 3 is for the commuter train A to Helsinki at 06:26 on weekday mornings.
 Track 4 is for commuter trains A and L towards Helsinki and for the commuter train L towards Kirkkonummi.

References

External links

Leppävaara
Railway stations in Espoo
Railway stations opened in 1903